Pontianak Kota (Pontianak town in English) is a district (Indonesian:kecamatan) of the city of Pontianak. It lies on the south bank of the Kapuas Besar River and covers an area of 15.98 km2. It had a population of 110,111 at the 2010 census; the latest official estimate of population (as at mid 2019) is 1227,700. This is the location of Pontianak's main civic administrative offices.

List of famous places in Pontianak Kota:
 Dwikora Harbour, main harbour of Pontianak
 Pontianak Major Office
 Inter-district ferry dock (connects North Pontianak and Pontianak Kota)
 Matahari Shopping Mall
 Kebon Sajoek Stadium, home of the city football club Persipon Pontianak

References

Pontianak
Populated places in West Kalimantan